El Escondido Airport  was an airstrip  southeast of Villamontes, in the Tarija Department of Bolivia.

Google Earth Historical Imagery (May 2005) shows runway closed markings (X's) placed along the length of the runway. Subsequent images from Bing and HERE/Nokia show progressive growth of brush and trees on the runway.

See also

Transport in Bolivia
List of airports in Bolivia

References

External links 
OpenStreetMap - El Escondido

Defunct airports
Airports in Tarija Department